Jack Sandlin is a Republican member of the Indiana Senate representing Senate District 36 where he has served since 2016. From 2010 to 2016, he was a member of the Indianapolis City-County Council for the 24th district. He also served as a Perry Township, Indiana Trustee from November 1997 to December 2006.

Career
Sandlin is a retired police officer. From 2010 to 2016, he was a member of the Indianapolis City-County Council for the 24th district. He also served as a Perry Township, Indiana Trustee from November 1997 to December 2006.

In 2017, he apologized for an offensive Facebook post on his account on the 2017 Women's March; he deleted the post, and said he did not post the message. In 2018, Sandlin sponsored a measure (which passed the state Senate) to allow churchgoers to carry guns while at worship services held on school property. He has called for consideration of the idea of regional jails in Indiana, rather than having a separate county jail in all of Indiana's 92 counties.

In 2019, Sandlin introduced legislation to fund a new Indy Eleven soccer stadium. Sandlin's legislation would have allowed the Capital Improvement Board (which oversees Gainbridge Fieldhouse, Lucas Oil Stadium, Victory Field, and the Indiana Convention Center) to collect taxes from a proposed Eleven Park mixed-use development to fund a $150 million soccer-specific stadium with a capacity of 20,000. A version of the legislation passed the Indiana General Assembly, but without language requiring that the stadium be home to a Major League Soccer team.

In 2020, Sandlin criticized the Marion County prosecutor on their decision to stop prosecuting marijuana possession cases in the county, and supported legislation that would allow the Indiana Attorney General to override county prosecutors' authority and discretion.

References

External links
Jack Sandlin at Ballotpedia
Vote Smart – Senator Jack Sandlin (IN) profile
Our Campaigns – Senator Mike Jack Sandlin (IN) profile
State Senate Website

Living people
Republican Party Indiana state senators
21st-century American politicians
Year of birth missing (living people)
Indianapolis City-County Council members